Charles Wilson Buttz (November 16, 1837 – July 20, 1913) was an American lawyer who served as U.S. Representative from South Carolina.

Early life

Born in Stroudsburg, Pennsylvania, Buttz moved with his parents to White Township, New Jersey, in 1839. He went on to study law in Belvidere, New Jersey, and was admitted to the bar in 1863. He practiced law in Norfolk, Virginia and went on to serve as solicitor of the first judicial circuit between 1872 and 1880. Buttz joined the Union Army in 1861 as a second lieutenant in the Eleventh Pennsylvania Cavalry, gaining a promotion to first lieutenant in 1862. He was wounded in 1863, and in October of that year resigned his commission on account of impaired health. He received two brevet ranks from the President, one as captain and the other as major, both dating from May 1865. He was appointed director of the Exchange Bank of Virginia in 1864, and then Commonwealth attorney for King William County in 1866. He moved to Charleston, South Carolina, in 1870.

Political career

He served as delegate to the Republican National Convention in 1864. In 1875, he contested as a Republican the election of Edmund W. M. Mackey to the Forty-fourth Congress, but the House decided that neither was entitled to the seat. Buttz was subsequently elected to fill the vacancy caused by the decision of the House and served from November 7, 1876, to March 3, 1877. He was not a candidate for renomination in 1876.

North Dakota
He moved to Fargo, North Dakota, in 1878 and became a bonanza farmer. He obtained the official organization of Ransom County in 1882, and served as state's attorney 1884–1886.  He served as a member of the North Dakota House of Representatives from 1903 to 1909.

He died in Lisbon, Ransom County, North Dakota, July 20, 1913 and was interred in Oakwood Cemetery.

References

1837 births
1913 deaths
People from Belvidere, New Jersey
People from Warren County, New Jersey
Virginia lawyers
Union Army officers
Republican Party members of the United States House of Representatives from South Carolina
19th-century American politicians
North Dakota Republicans
People from Ransom County, North Dakota
19th-century American lawyers
Military personnel from New Jersey